Myron Corey "Boo" Bell (born September 15, 1971) is a former safety in the National Football League (NFL). He played for the Pittsburgh Steelers and Cincinnati Bengals. He started in Super Bowl XXX. He is a member of the City of Toledo, Ohio Hall of Fame. As a teenager he played at Macomber High School (class of 1989) where he made the All-American 1st team in the state of Ohio for high school football players and also made the city of Toledo, Ohio Hall of Fame. He also teamed up with NBA star and Big Ten Network analyst Jim Jackson to win the 1988-89 OHSAA Division I basketball championship.  Right now, he currently works with Charlotte-Mecklenburg School system with at-risk youth and helps his church with youth sports with close friends and former NFL football players Brentson Buckner and Adrian Murrell. The youth football league they coach together is in a football league associated with former NFL football players Ethan Horton, Mike Minter, Michael Dean Perry, and Mike Rucker.  He has two children, Kennedy and Corey.  
 

1971 births
Living people
American football safeties
Cincinnati Bengals players
Michigan State Spartans football players
Sportspeople from Toledo, Ohio
Pittsburgh Steelers players

References